Juan Pablo Romero Fuentes, born in 1983, is the founder of the Organisation "Los Patojos".

The non - profit organisation focuses on improving living standards and quality of life of Guatamalian children. The ethos of the organisation is in-line with the creation of an affordable and effective solution in response to poverty affected children . Fuentes focuses on ensuring the organisation successfully provides for the children involved, he designs enriching daily activities for the children to participate in. This project hopes to improve individuals' lives as well as the larger Guatemalan community.

Early life 
Romero Fuentes was born September 16, 1983. He was raised in Jocotenango, a small neighborhood outside Antigua, Guatemala by his parents, Rudy Romero and María Fuentes. Romero Fuentes witnessed a lot of his friends turning to violence and drug related gangs while he grew up. He soon realized while he was a teacher that his students were growing up in similar conditions. He very quickly came to acknowledge that life living in poverty and violence seemed to feel inescapable to Guatemalan youth, unfortunately, this is a continuous issue in this country. According to the United Nations, Guatemala has the fifth worst homicide rate. He came into contact with families that were falling apart based on different factors such as parents being unemployed, with no more hope or motivation to keep on going. Romero Fuentes' childhood, among other children's, is what led to him to take action and develop the facility and program Los Patojos.

Work and career 
As a teacher, he watched multiple kids struggle with similar things he faced as a kid. The struggles ranged from violence, unplanned pregnancies, and drug use. Having to see these kids go through different forms of conflict daily motivated Romero Fuentes to open up a community center named "Los Patojos", meaning "The Little Ones", to help kids if they were willing to receive help. This center would offer many resources such as tutoring help, free meals, affordable medical care, and more. Romero Fuentes' purpose for opening this community center was to give kids the opportunity to be successful, “to give them a better present in order to attain a brighter future,” and to create a safe environment for kids who have been exposed to drugs and violence. The "Los Patojos" website declares that their mission is to educate, their reason for being is childhood, and their strategy is on dreams and ideas.

With the help of his friends and family, Romero Fuentes was able to establish a rewarding community center that started as something little but soon flourished. Los Patojos is a center full of warmth and laughter, a place where children are learning and making friendships every day. Children are learning to love, to trust, to let loose, and to have fun. Some activities that Romero Fuentes arranged within the center consists of art projects, dancing, theatre, writing, and photography.

JustWorld International and Los Patojos announced the release of a new book written by Romero Fuentes. The book will be titled "Los Patojos' Methodology and Perspectives of the Future". This book tells the story of Los Patojos and his journey to create his organization and become a powerful role model. The book will not only be written in Spanish, but also translated into English for one reason being that Romero Fuentes wants to extend the idea of Los Patojos to places throughout the world.

Social change 
Romero Fuentes has impacted over one thousand lives of children ranging from four to twenty-one years old. The non-profit organization, JustWorld International, "provides educations, nutrition, health and hygiene, as well as leadership and cultural development programs for children and young adults, aged four to eighteen". Romero Fuentes teamed up with JustWorld International to help support impoverished communities in Cambodia, Guatemala, and Honduras. Los Patojos has not only changed the lives of so many children, but also people who have seen his work. Romero Fuentes encourages children to want to be better people and make them want to help other people because they recognize all of the good that Romero Fuentes does to the community. An idea that somebody thought of from observing Romero Fuentes' work is to make a shelter for kids. One person with the ability to spark a flame in each one of the kids he helps has had an impact one could only imagine. Ultimately, he made a huge difference in the community and then applying it to a global scale, he was able to save kids’ lives.

Awards and honors
The Guatemalan government granted Romero Fuentes the right to open up an official school with 270 students due to his contributions to the community around him.

Romero Fuentes, being the only Latin American nominated, was honored as a top 10 CNN Hero in 2014. His award led CNN's sponsor, Subaru, to donate $250,000 to Los Patojos. Romero Fuentes stated that he did not do this for the attention and reward, but rather to build a better community that is useful to others. He wanted the children of Guatemala to avoid drugs, violence, and poverty as much as possible because he did not want children to experience the things he had to experience growing up. The main focus was to give children a better present so they can live a better future. JustWorld International has supported Los Patojos since the year of 2008 because they take pride in helping over 1,000 children find good education, nutrition, development, and all of the resources that Los Patojos offers.

Notes 

1983 births
Guatemalan schoolteachers
Living people
People from Sacatepéquez Department